Madut Biar Yel is a South Sudanese politician. He is the current Minister for Telecommunication and Postal Services in the Cabinet of South Sudan. He was appointed to that position on 10 July 2011.

See also
 Ministry of Telecommunication and Postal Services (South Sudan)
 SPLM
 SPLA
 Cabinet of South Sudan

References

Living people
Government ministers of South Sudan
Year of birth missing (living people)